Ann Kananu Mwenda is a Kenyan criminologist, politician and public administrator who, effective 16 November 2021, served as the Governor of Nairobi County.

Before that, from 15 January 2021 until 16 November 2021, she serves as the substantive Deputy Governor of Nairobi County, after vetting by the county legislature.

She also served as the Acting Governor of the county, following the December 2020 impeachment and removal from office of Mike Sonko, the previous governor. In keeping with Kenyan laws, Kananu  served out the remaining term of the previous governor.

Background and education
Ann Kananu was born in May 1980, in Embu County. She attended St. Michael Primary School, in her home county, before joining Our Lady Of Mercy Girls Secondary School, Magundu, an all-girls boarding school in Tharaka Nithi County, administered by the Catholic Church. She graduated from there with the Kenya Certificate of Secondary Education (KCSE) in 1999.

She holds a Bachelor of Science degree in  Criminology and Security Management, awarded by Dedan Kimathi University of Technology in 2016. She also holds a Diploma in Criminology and Security Management, obtained from St. Paul's University, Limuru, in 2013. In addition, she holds two certificates obtained from the University of Nairobi, between 2011 and 2012; the first, a Certificate in Human Resource Management and the second a Certificate in Public Relations. Her other qualifications include a Certificate in Crisis Management from AVSEC and a Female Screening Training Certificate obtained from the US Department of Homeland Security.

Career 

Anne Kananu Mwenda has a varied career history dating back nearly twenty years from the date she took the helm at Nairobi County Local Government. From 2002 until 2003, she served as a Customer Service Representative and then as Personal Assistant to the CEO, at Mokir Enterprises Limited. She was then hired by H. Mogambi and Company Advocates, working there as a personal assistant,  from 2003 until 2004.

Later, she took up employment with Kenya Airports Authority as the Security Supervisor responsible for Quality Control and Training. In May 2018, Kananu Mwenda was hired by Nairobi City Hall as the Chief Officer in charge of Disaster Management and Coordination. This was her role until she was sworn in as Deputy Governor in January 2021.

Personal
In the past, Ann Kananu Mwenda was married to the late Philip Njiru Muthathai. He died in a road traffic accident in January 2019.

References

External links
 Official Website of Nairobi County Government

Living people
1980 births
Kikuyu people
Kenyan politicians
21st-century Kenyan women politicians
21st-century Kenyan politicians
University of Nairobi alumni
Dedan Kimathi University alumni
St. Paul's University, Limuru alumni
People from Embu County